Zodarion timidum is a spider species found in Spain and France.

See also 
 List of Zodariidae species

References

External links 

timidum
Spiders of Europe
Spiders described in 1874